Danby is a surname. Notable people with the surname include:

Abstrupus Danby (1655–1727), English wool merchant
Christopher Danby (1503-1571), English politician and landowner
Francis Danby (1793–1861), Irish painter
Gordon Danby, American physicist
Graeme Danby (born 1962), English operatic bass
Herbert Danby (1889–1953), English priest and writer
James Francis Danby (1816–1875), English landscape painter
John Danby (disambiguation), multiple people 
Ken Danby (1940–2007), Canadian artist
Michael Danby (born 1955), Australian politician
Nicholas Danby (1935–1997) English organist, composer and teacher
Noah Danby (born 1974), Canadian actor
Robert Danby (died 1474), British justice
Thomas Danby (disambiguation), multiple people
Tom Danby (1926–2022), English rugby player
William Danby (writer) (1752–1833), English writer
William Danby (coroner)